Sajama is a province in the northwestern parts of the Bolivian Oruro Department.

Location
Sajama province is one of the sixteen provinces in the Oruro Department. It is located between 17° 39' and 18° 39' South and between 67° 38' and 68° 45' West.

The province borders the La Paz Department in the north-west, the Republic of Chile in the west, Sabaya Province in the south-west, Litoral Province in the south-east, Carangas Province in the east, and San Pedro de Totora Province in the north-east.

The province extends over 120 km from north to south, and 135 km from east to west.

Geography 
The highest mountain in the province is the extinct Sajama volcano in the Sajama National Park. Other mountains are listed below:

Population
The main language of the province is Aymara, spoken by 90.4%, while 88.6% of the population speak Spanish and 4.2% Quechua (1992).

The population increased from 7,891 inhabitants (1992 census) to 9,096 (2001 census), an increase of 15.3%. - 43.4% of the population are younger than 15 years old (1992).

97.0% of the population have no access to electricity, 90.8% have no sanitary facilities (1992).

8.2% of the population are employed in agriculture, 0.3% in mining, 5.4% in industry, 26.1% in general services (2001).

66.1% of the population are Catholics, 26.9% are Protestants (1992).

Division
The province comprises two municipalities which are further subdivided into cantons.

See also 
 Ch'ankha Muqu
 Ch'iyar Quta
 Sura K'uchu
 Waña Quta

References

External links
Population data (Spanish)

Provinces of Oruro Department